Monte António Gomes is a mountain in the northeastern part of the island of São Vicente, Cape Verde. Its elevation is 362 meters. It is 1.6 km north of Monte Verde, 2.3 km southeast of the village Salamansa and 6 km east of the city centre of Mindelo.

See also
 List of mountains in Cape Verde

References

Mountains of Cape Verde
Geography of São Vicente, Cape Verde